John Hylton may refer to:
 John Hylton, de jure 18th Baron Hylton, English politician
 John Scott Hylton, English antiquary and poet

See also
 Jack Hylton, English pianist, composer, band leader and impresario
 John Hilton (disambiguation)